Cecilia Freire Peñas (born 17 November 1981) is a Spanish actress best known for playing Blanca Román on Física o Química (2008–2009) and Rita Montesinos on Velvet (2014–2016).

Personal life
On 30 July 2016, she married the Spanish television presenter of Epectaculos Francisco, whom they affectionately call Lolo in a civil ceremony in Segovia, Spain. On 23 June 2017, she gave birth to the couple's first child, a girl, whom they called Inés.

Career
Cecilia Freire felt a calling to be an actress as a child, and started studying acting at age 14.

She has worked as a film, theater, and television actress. In 2008 she became very popular for her role in the film Mortadelo and Filemon. Mission: Save the Planet.

In theater, she has worked in London in The Winter's Tale, while in Spain she has been in plays such as La katarsis del tomatazo and Pero ¿quién mató el teatro?, in addition to having taken her first steps in shorts like La habitación de los abrigos by Nerea Madariaga.

In television, she appeared in La vida de Rita on La 1 (2003), on the Telecinco series  (2006), which was not very successful, and played Setefilla on Hospital Central on Telecinco (2007).

From 2008 to 2009, she was part of the Antena 3 series Física o Química in the role of Blanca, the Zurbarán Institute's literature professor, which made her known to the general public. She was one of its veterans, with a character who was always very prominent in stories, but left the series to focus on her theatrical career, having already been successful in the play Luz de gas. 

In 2011 she shot another short, Aunque todo vaya mal, the directing debut of the actress , who had joined Física o Química to play Marina, the new philosophy professor, just after Freire left.

From 2014 to 2016 she gave life to the character Rita Montesinos on the Antena 3 series Velvet. Rita is a seamstress in the Galleries, who along with her friends Ana (Paula Echevarría) and Luisa (Manuela Vellés) and her sister Clara (Marta Hazas) are known as the "Velvet girls". Freire appeared in the first four seasons of the series. In October 2016 she won Best Female Performer at the 63rd edition of the Ondas Awards for her role as Rita Montesinos.

In November 2016 she played Inma in the film Don't Blame the Karma for Being an Idiot, a comedy directed by Maria Ripoll based on Laura Norton's homonymous novel.

Since 2018 she has starred in the TVE series La otra mirada, where she shares the screen with actresses such as Macarena García, Patricia López Arnaiz, and Ana Wagener.

Filmography

Movies

Television

Awards and nominations

References

External links
 

1981 births
21st-century Spanish actresses
Actresses from Madrid
Living people
Spanish film actresses
Spanish stage actresses
Spanish television actresses